Partial general elections were held in Belgium on 9 June 1874. The result was a victory for the Catholic Party, which won 68 of the 124 seats in the Chamber of Representatives and 34 of the 62 seats in the Senate. Voter turnout was 64.1%, although only 52,074 people were eligible to vote.

Under the alternating system, elections for the Chamber of Representatives were only held in four out of the nine provinces: Hainaut, Limburg, Liège and East Flanders.

Incumbent Head of Government Barthélémy de Theux de Meylandt was re-elected in the arrondissement of Hasselt but died on 21 August 1874. A special election was held on 27 September 1874 to replace him, which Henri de Pitteurs-Hiegaerts won.

Additionally, a special election was held in the arrondissement of Tielt to replace Gustave de Mûelenaere, who died on 8 July 1874; this is of note as future Prime Minister Auguste Beernaert was elected to succeed him.

Results

Chamber of Representatives

Senate

References

1870s elections in Belgium
General
Belgium
Belgium